In the Calendar of the Scottish Episcopal Church, each holy and saint's day listed has been assigned a number which indicates its category. It is intended that feasts in categories 1 - 4 should be kept by the whole church. Days in categories 5 and 6 may be kept according to diocesan or local discretion. Commemorations not included in this Calendar may be observed with the approval of the bishop.

Categories

Category 1
Maundy Thursday, Good Friday, Holy Saturday
Easter Day (and the weekdays following)
Pentecost
Ash Wednesday
Holy Week
Ascension Day
Christmas Day
Epiphany
Sundays of Advent, Lent and Easter

Category 2
Feasts of The Lord (Naming, Presentation, Annunciation, Transfiguration)
Trinity Sunday
All Saints' Day
Dedication and Patronal Festivals
Eves of Christmas and Pentecost
First Sunday after Christmas
First Sunday after Epiphany (Baptism of the Lord)

Category 3
Sundays after Christmas (except Christmas 1)
Sundays after Epiphany (except Epiphany 1)
Sundays after Pentecost (except Pentecost 1)
Weekdays in Lent

Category 4
Feasts of the Apostles and Evangelists
Saint Mary the Virgin, The Visit to Elizabeth
Saint Joseph, Saint John the Baptist (Birth, Beheading)
Saint Mary Magdalene, Saint Michael and All Angels
Saint James of Jerusalem
Saint Stephen, The Holy Innocents
Saint Kentigern, Saint Patrick, Saint Columba, Saint Ninian, Saint Margaret of Scotland

Category 5
All Souls' Day, Holy Cross Day;
Conception of Mary, Mother of the Lord, Birth of Mary, Mother of the Lord
Thanksgiving for the Institution of the Holy Communion (Corpus Christi);
Thanksgiving for Harvest

Category 6
All other commemorations

Calendar days

January
2 Seraphim of Sarov, 1833
10 William Laud, Bishop, 1645
11 David, King of Scots, 1153
14 Hilary of Poitiers, Bishop and Teacher of the Faith, c. 367
17 Anthony of Egypt, Abbot, 356
21 Agnes, Martyr, c. 304
24 Francis de Sales, Bishop, 1622
27 John Chrysostom, Bishop and Teacher of the Faith, 407
28 Thomas Aquinas, Teacher of the Faith, 1274
30 Charles I, King, 1649
31 Charles Mackenzie of Central Africa, Bishop, Missionary, Martyr, 1862

February
1 Brigid of Kildare, Abbess, c. 525
3 Saints and Martyrs of Europe
6 Paul Miki, Priest, and the Martyrs of Japan, 1597
10 Scholastica, Religious, 543
14 Cyril, Monk, 869, and Methodius, Bishop, 885, "Apostles of the Slavs"
15 Thomas Bray, Priest and Missionary, 1730
17 Finan of Lindisfarne, Bishop, 661
18 Colman of Lindisfarne, Bishop, 676
19 Martin Luther, 1545
23 Polycarp of Smyrna, Bishop and Martyr, 156

March
1 David, Bishop, Patron of Wales, c. 544
2 Chad of Lichfield, Bishop, 672
3 John and Charles Wesley, Priests, 1791, 1788
4 Adrian of May Island, Abbot, and Companions, Martyrs, 875
6 Baldred, Bishop, 608
7 Perpetua and her Companions, Martyrs, 203
8 Duthac, Bishop, 1068
10 Kessog, Bishop, c. 700
16 Boniface of Ross, Bishop, 8th century
18 Cyril of Jerusalem, Bishop and Teacher of the Faith, 386
20 Cuthbert, Bishop, 687
21 Thomas Cranmer, Bishop, 1556
22 Thomas Ken, Bishop, 1711
24 Paul Couturier, Priest, 1953
28 Patrick Forbes, Bishop, 1635, and the Aberdeen doctors, Teachers of the Faith
29 John Keble, Priest, 1866

April
1 Gilbert of Caithness, Bishop, 1245
9 Dietrich Bonhoeffer, Theologian and Martyr, 1945
10 William Law, Priest, 1761
11 George Augustus Selwyn, Bishop and Missionary, 1878
12 William Forbes, Bishop, 1634
16 Magnus of Orkney, Martyr, c. 1116
17 Saint Donnan, Abbot, and Companions, Martyrs, c. 617
20 Máel Ruba of Applecross, Abbot, 722
21 Anselm of Canterbury, Bishop and Teacher of the Faith, 1109
23 George, Patron of England, Martyr, c. 303
26 Albert Ernest Laurie, Priest, 1937
29 Catherine of Siena, Mystic and Teacher of the Faith, 1380

May
2 Athanasius of Alexandria, Bishop and Teacher of the Faith, 373
8 Julian of Norwich, c. 1413
12 Thomas Rattray, Bishop, 1743
21 Helena, c. 330
23 William of Perth (or Rochester), 1201
25 Bede, the Venerable, of Jarrow, Teacher of the Faith, 735
26 Augustine of Canterbury, Bishop, c. 604

June
1 Justin of Rome, Martyr, c. 165
3 Charles Lwanga and his companions, 1886, Janani Luwum, Bishop, 1977, Martyrs of Uganda
4 John XXIII, Bishop of Rome, Reformer, 1963
5 Boniface of Mainz, Bishop, Missionary and Martyr, 754
8 Ephrem the Syrian, Deacon and Teacher of the Faith, 373
12 John Skinner, Priest, 1807, and John Skinner, Bishop, 1816
14 Basil of Caesarea, 379; Gregory of Nazianzus, 390; Gregory of Nyssa, 394, Bishops and Teachers of the Faith
18 Bernard Mizeki, Martyr, 1896
20 Fillan, Abbot, c. 750
22 Alban, Martyr, c. 209
25 Moluag of Lismore, Bishop, c. 592
26 Robert Leighton, Bishop, 1684
27 Alexander Jolly, Bishop, 1838
28 Irenaeus of Lyons, Bishop and Teacher of the Faith, 202

July
1 Serf, Bishop, c. 500
6 Palladius, Bishop, c. 450
7 Boisil, Prior of Melrose, c. 642
11 Benedict of Nursia, Abbot, c. 550
12 Drostan of Deer, Abbot, c. 600
17 Jane Haining, Missionary and Martyr, 1944
21 William Wilberforce, 1833
26 Anne and Joachim, Parents of Mary, Mother of the Lord
27 John Comper, Priest, 1903
29 Martha and Mary of Bethany
30 Silas, Companion of Saint Paul
31 Ignatius Loyola, Priest and Religious, 1556

August
5 Oswald of Northumbria, Martyr, 642
7 John Mason Neale, Priest, 1866
8 Dominic, Priest and Friar, 1221
10 Lawrence, Deacon and Martyr, 258
11 Clare of Assisi, Religious, 1253
12 Blane, Missionary, c. 590
13 Jeremy Taylor, Bishop, 1667
14 Maximilian Kolbe, Priest and Martyr, 1940
20 Bernard of Clairvaux, Abbot and Teacher of the Faith, 1153
25 Ebba of Coldingham, Abbess, 683
27 Monica, Mother of Augustine of Hippo, 387
28 Augustine of Hippo, Bishop and Teacher of the Faith, 430
31 Aidan of Lindisfarne, Bishop, 651

September
2 The Martyrs of New Guinea, 1942
3 Gregory the Great, Bishop and Teacher of the Faith, 604
13 Cyprian of Carthage, Bishop and Martyr, 258
17 Hildegard of Bingen, Abbess, 1179
20 John Coleridge Patteson, Bishop and Martyr, 1871
23 Adamnan of Iona, Abbot, 704
25 Finnbar of Caithness, Bishop, c. 610
27 Vincent de Paul, Priest, 1660
30 Jerome, Priest and Teacher of the Faith, 420

October
1 Gregory the Enlightener, Bishop, “Apostle of Armenia”, c. 332
4 Francis of Assisi, Deacon and Friar, 1226
8 Alexander Penrose Forbes, Bishop, 1875
11 Kenneth, Abbot, 600
12 Elizabeth Fry, 18456
15 Teresa of Avila, Teacher of the Faith, 1582
17 Ignatius of Antioch, Bishop and Martyr, c. 115
19 Henry Martyn, Priest and Missionary, 1812
29 James Hannington, Bishop, and Companions, Martyrs, 1885

November
3 Richard Hooker, Priest and Teacher of the Faith, 1600
7 Willibrord, Bishop and Missionary, 739
9 George Hay Forbes, Priest, 1875
10 Leo the Great, Bishop and Teacher of the Faith, 461
11 Martin of Tours, Bishop, c. 397
12 Machar, Bishop, c. 600
17 Hugh of Lincoln, Bishop, 1200
18 Fergus, Bishop, c. 750
19 Hilda of Whitby, 680
21 Columban, Bishop, 615
22 Cecilia, Martyr, c. 230
23 Clement of Rome, Bishop and Martyr, c. 100
24 Lucy Menzies, 1954

December
1 Charles de Foucauld, Priest and Hermit, 1916
2 Nicholas Ferrar, Deacon, 1637
3 Francis Xavier, Priest and Missionary, 1552
4 Clement of Alexandria, Teacher of the Faith, c. 210
6 Nicholas of Myra, Bishop, 4th century
7 Ambrose of Milan, Bishop and Teacher of the Faith, 397
14 John of the Cross, Priest, Teacher of the Faith, 1591
29 Thomas of Canterbury, Bishop and Martyr, 1170
30 Josephine Butler, 1905
31 John Wycliffe, Priest, 1384

Sources
 SEC digital calendar

References

Scottish Episcopal Church
Scottish